Seixal Futebol Clube is a Portuguese sports club from Seixal, in the Setúbal district. The club had a main football squad but it folded in 2007 due to financial reasons. It only currently maintains the junior divisions.

The club's football divisions play there games at the Estádio do Bravo which holds a capacity of 5000. The club was founded in 1925, and its main section is rink hockey (playing at 3 Division, zone D).  It is also a basketball and a futsal club.

Appearances (football)

Premier Division: 2 (twice)
Second Division: 28
Third Division: 36

League and cup history
The club has two presences at the top level of Portuguese football.

Honours
Terceira Divisão: 2
1960–61, 1967–68

Taça Ribeiro dos Reis: 1
1961–62

References

External links
Official site
ZeroZero profile
ForaDeJogo.net profile

Football clubs in Portugal
Rink hockey clubs in Portugal
Association football clubs established in 1926
Basketball teams established in 1926
Sports clubs established in 1926
Primeira Liga clubs